Gawayn is an animated television series created and designed by Jan Van Rijsselberge. It is produced by Alphanim, Gaumont Animation, and Mondo TV, and the series has been dubbed into different languages. The title of the show refers to King Arthur's nephew Gawain. As of April 2012, Gawayn has been shown on the Starz Kids & Family cable network. It was also the first Alphanim-produced cartoon to get dubbed in Japanese.

Synopsis 
In the mystical city of Camelot, William is an optimistic knight-in-training who is devoted to his mentor, knight in gleaming armor, Sir Roderick. The complication starts when the evil Duke of Amaraxos shrinks Princess Gwendolyn and takes over the kingdom, so the friends accompanied by Elspeth, an apprentice sorceress, and Xiao Long, a young sage-in-training from distant Asia, set off on an adventure to undo the terrible curse by finding The Crystal of Gawayn.

The Questers finally attain the Crystal of Gawayn which they were originally going to use to undue Princess Gwendolyn's curse. But thanks to Sir Roderick's impatience and clumsiness, he interrupts the process causing Gwen's size to be unstable. And to make matters worse, his clumsiness shatters the Crystal and they lose the Great Book of Magic which flies off after the failed spell. Now they return to life on the road with a new quest and adventure which is to reclaim the book and use it to find a way to repair the Crystal and finally break the princess' altered curse.

Characters 

William (voiced by:Sonja Ball) - A knight-in-training of the Questers. He wants to be a knight and has made many current inventions. He's Elspeth's younger brother. His age is 10, and despite his young age, he is very intelligent, the brain of the group. He is Sir Roderick's squire and apprentice.
Sir Roderick (voiced by:Bruce Dinsmore) - A knight and boyfriend of Princess Gwen. He is very clumsy and often creates problems that put the team in unnecessary trouble and danger.
Princess Gwendolyn (voiced by:Claudia Besso) - A deposed princess who has been reduced to the size of a doll by the Duke and Rex. Despite her size, she is capable of taking down opponents bigger than herself. In season 2, she was finally to be restored to her original size when they used the crystal, but Sir Roderick interrupted the process that caused it to be shattered, rendering her transformation unstable, now her size changes from small to big.
Elspeth (voiced by:Emma Taylor-Isherwood) - A redhead apprentice magician. She wields the Great Book of Magic that the Duke used to shrink Gwendolyn which she now uses to help the team in their search for the Crystal. She is William's older sister, and they both speak with English accents. In season 2, due to Sir Roderick's idiocy, she botched the restoration process, not only making Gwen's size in constant flux but lost the Great Book of Magic which flew away. She is 10 years old, until Ferocious Fairies, and now, she’s 11 for the rest of the show.
Xiao Long (voiced by:Lucinda Davis) A young 10-year-old Chinese boy and the most gifted of the pack, is a martial arts expert and a sage-in-training. He can cook well. In the second series, it is revealed that the ghost of his grandfather was the one who gives clues to the team on where the Crystal of Gawayn is. He is included in the series to increase appeal among Asian audiences.
The Duke (voiced by:Rick Jones) The enemy of the team. It was he who shrunk Gwendolyn to usurp the throne from her. He is a failure. Even though he is angry, he can show his heart to his pet and cockroach friend Rex. Together with him, he watches the team on his personal viewing stone which he uses to thwart the Questers' efforts at every turn.
Rex (voiced by:Richard Dumont) The Duke's friend and pet; cockroach. He seems cruel, but he is kind at times and tries to console the Duke. He has known him since childhood. Even though Duke is a loser, he likes him because he looks after him and they spend time together.

Episodes

Season 1

Season 2 
To be added.

Production 
The Series is originally going to be named "The Questers" in 2007. One series of 52 thirteen-minute episodes were produced by production companies Alphanim and
Mondo TV France for the French TV Series: Sherlock Yack (Based on book series of Milan Jeunesse/Editions Milan) (2011), Lulu Vroumette (Based on book series by Magnard Jewhesse) (2012-2013) and Marcus Level  (2013). version and Mondo TV Italy for the Italian Version. The English version is also translated by Mondo TV France.
A second season has also been produced.

International broadcasts

References

External links

Series Profile  at Gaumont Animation.

2000s French animated television series
2010s French animated television series
2009 French television series debuts
2011 French television series endings
French children's animated comedy television series
French children's animated fantasy television series
Italian children's animated comedy television series
Italian children's animated fantasy television series
Gaumont Animation
French flash animated television series
Italian flash animated television series
Renaissance in popular culture
Witchcraft in television
Films about size change
Animated television series about children
Television series by Muse Entertainment
Television series by Nelvana